Grant Barry Anderson (born October 24, 1954) is an associate justice of the Minnesota Supreme Court. He is a former member of the Minnesota Court of Appeals.

Early life and education
Anderson was born on October 24, 1954, and grew up in Mankato, Minnesota. He is a 1976 graduate of Gustavus Adolphus College, receiving a Bachelor of Arts magna cum laude, and a 1979 graduate of the University of Minnesota Law School, receiving a Juris Doctor

Anderson was a general-practice lawyer first in Fairmont and then in Hutchinson, where he served as city attorney for over a decade. He is certified as a civil trial specialist by the Minnesota State Bar Association and is an experienced trial lawyer, representing both plaintiffs and defendants in a wide variety of cases.

Career

Anderson’s background includes service as chairman of the Board of Directors of Hutchinson Community Video Network, a local public-access television effort, two terms as President of the Hutchinson Rotary Club and a wide variety of other community activities. More recently he has served as a member of the Minnesota Valley YMCA Community Board of Directors, as a youth athletics coach, and as a national judge of the “We the People” high school civics competition. Anderson is a frequent contributor to continuing legal education efforts and has lectured on the use of expert witnesses and similar topics. He also serves on the Judicial Council, the statewide governing board for the Minnesota Judicial Branch.

Anderson served on the Minnesota Court of Appeals from August 1998 until 2004. He was appointed to the Minnesota Supreme Court by Governor Tim Pawlenty in 2004, beginning October 13, 2004. In 2006, he was elected to a six-year term. Dean Barkley, who briefly served as a U.S. Senator from Minnesota in 2002 after the death of Paul Wellstone, ran against Anderson in the 2012 election. Anderson won reelection to another six-year term with 58.9% of the vote.

Anderson has also served as the moderator of Pioneer PBS's "Your Legislators" for over 20 years.

References

External links

Judge Profile: Associate Justice G. Barry Anderson, Minnesota Judicial Branch.

Justices of the Minnesota Supreme Court
1954 births
Living people
Gustavus Adolphus College alumni
University of Minnesota Law School alumni
Politicians from Mankato, Minnesota
Minnesota Court of Appeals judges
People from Fairmont, Minnesota
People from Hutchinson, Minnesota
21st-century American judges